Dame Elizabeth Violet Blackadder, Mrs Houston,  (24 September 1931 – 23 August 2021) was a Scottish painter and printmaker. She was the first woman to be elected to both the Royal Scottish Academy and the Royal Academy.

In 1962 she began teaching at Edinburgh College of Art where she continued until her retirement in 1986. Blackadder worked in a variety of media such as oil paints, watercolour, drawing, and printmaking. In her still life paintings and drawings, she considered space between objects carefully. She also painted portraits and landscapes but her later work contains mainly her cats and flowers with extreme detail. Her work can be seen at the Tate Gallery, the Scottish National Gallery of Modern Art, and the Museum of Modern Art in New York, and has appeared on a series of Royal Mail stamps.

In 2012, Blackadder was chosen to paint Scottish First Minister Alex Salmond's official Christmas card.

Early years
Blackadder was born and raised at 7 Weir Street, Falkirk, the third child of Thomas and Violet Isabella Blackadder. Violet Blackadder ensured Elizabeth benefited from a series of promising educational opportunities and, determined to spare her daughter the struggles she had been through, convinced her own father to support Elizabeth's training as a domestic science teacher. Blackadder's father died when she was 10. Her mother died, aged 89, in 1984.

She spent a substantial part of her childhood alone, due in part to a keen appetite for reading. During her teenage years Blackadder began meticulously collecting local flowers, compiling the specimens by pressing and labelling them with their full Latin names, a fascination that was to surface much later in her paintings of plants and flowers.

Education
A former pupil of Falkirk High School, she donated one of her paintings to the school on the occasion of its centenary in 1986. Blackadder remembered the pleasure she derived from her art classes in particular, but also enjoying dissecting and drawing plants as part of her botanical studies; she spent the majority of her sixth year in the art room at Falkirk High School.

She arrived in Edinburgh in September 1949 to start on the nearly approved Fine Art degree and graduated with first class honours in 1954. Blackadder studied early Byzantine art while at university, and one of the most enduring influences on her work was her tutor and prolific painter William Gillies. Blackadder spent the fourth and fifth years of her MA course concentrating on her imminent examinations; it was during this period that she met Scottish artist John Houston who was to later become her husband.

The fifth and final year of Blackadder's Fine Art degree was spent at Edinburgh College of Art where she researched throughout the year for her dissertation on William MacTaggart. She graduated in 1954 with first-class degree and was awarded both a Carnegie travelling scholarship by the Royal Scottish Academy and an Andrew Grant Postgraduate Scholarship by Edinburgh College of Art.

Career

In 1954, Blackadder put the money from her Carnegie scholarship towards spending three months travelling through Yugoslavia, Greece, and Italy, where she focused on classical and Byzantine art. In 1962 her painting, White Still Life, Easter was given the Gurtrie Award for best work by a young artist at the Royal Scottish Academy.During the 1960s she developed her interests in still life while continuing with her love of landscape by painting landscapes in France, Spain, Portugal, and Scotland and acquired a growing reputation for her paintings of flowers, Flowers on an Indian Cloth being a notable example . During her travels to France she became more aware of the artist Henri Matisse and because of this influence she ended up lightening up her palette.

In the 1980s she visited Japan on a number of occasions and many of her paintings at the time showed the influence of these trips. First visiting in 1985 and returning the following year, Blackadder's interest in Eastern techniques and subject matter was realised in a series of vibrant oils and watercolours shown at the Mercury Gallery in 1991. Her desire to avoid the technical vibrancy of Tokyo took Blackadder to the Zen gardens of Kyoto; in many ways, her work depicts the principles of Zen which give paramount importance to the idea of empty space. Blackadder also traveled to the United States of America. Souvenirs of her travels would appear in many of her paintings.

Blackadder began working at Glasgow Print Studio in 1985, after being invited to make prints there. She worked with master print makers from that time until around 2014, working predominantly to produce etchings and screenprint with some lithographs and woodcuts. Her subject matter was dominated by cats and flowers but also included images from travels in Europe and Japan.

Honours
Blackadder was the first woman to be an academician of both the Royal Academy of Arts in London and the Royal Scottish Academy; in 1982 she was awarded the OBE for her contribution to art which was promoted to a DBE in 2003.

In 2001, she was appointed Her Majesty's Painter and Limner in Scotland.

Along with an Honorary degree from Heriot-Watt University in 1989, Blackadder has been awarded honorary doctorates by at least three other universities.

Family
In 1956 she married painter John Houston. The couple took up residence in a large villa in The Grange district of Edinburgh, which she continued to occupy until her death in 2021 (Houston died in 2008).

Death
Blackadder died on 23 August 2021, aged 89.

Exhibitions

Solo exhibitions

57 Gallery, Edinburgh, 1959
The Scottish Gallery, Aitken Dott, Edinburgh, 1961
Mercury Gallery, London, 1965
The Scottish Gallery, Aitken Dott, Edinburgh 1966
Thames Gallery, Eton, 1966
Mercury Gallery, London, 1967
Reading Art Gallery and Museum, 1968
Lane Art Gallery, Bradford, 1968
New Paintings, Mercury Gallery, London, 14 October 1969 – 8 November 1969
Vaccarino Gallery, Florence, 1970
Scottish Arts Council Retrospective Touring Exhibition; Edinburgh, Sheffield, Aberdeen, Liverpool, Cardiff, London, 1981–82
Theo Waddington Gallery, Toronto, Canada, 1982
New Paintings, Mercury Gallery, London, 14 October 1988 – 19 November 1988
Elizabeth Blackadder, Aberystwth Arts Centre, 8 April 1989 – 20 May 1989, the Gardener Centre, Brighton, 3 June 1989 – 8 July 1989, Oriel Bangor Art Gallery, 15 July 1989 – 19 August 1989
New Oils and Watercolours, Mercury Gallery, London, 22 May 1991 – 22 June 1991
New Work, Oils and Watercolours, Mercury Gallery, London, 22 September 1993 – 23 October 1993
New Oils and Watercolours, Mercury Gallery, London, 16 October 1996 – 16 November 1996
Elizabeth Blackadder, Mercury Gallery, London, 20 October 1999 – 20 November 1999
Paintings, Prints and Watercolours 1955-2000, Talbot Rice Gallery, Edinburgh 28 July 2000 – 15 September 2000

Selected group exhibitions 
 Contemporary Scottish Painting, Toronto, Canada, 1961
 Fourteen Scottish Painters, Commonwealth Institute, London, 1963-1964
 Three Centuries of Scottish Painting, National Gallery of Canada, Ottawa, 1968
 The Edinburgh School, Edinburgh College of Art, 1971
 Edinburgh Ten 30, Scottish Arts Council Exhibition touring Wales, 1975
 British Paintings 1952-1977, Royal Academy, London, 1977
 Painters in Parallel, Scottish Arts Council, Edinburgh College of Art, 1978
 Scottish Paintings and Tapestries, Offenburg, West Germany, 1979
 The British Art Show, Arts Council of Great Britain touring exhibition, 1980
 Master Weavers, Dovecot Studios' Tapestries, Scottish Arts Council, Edinburgh, 1980
 Six Scottish Painters, Graham Gallery, New York, 1982
 Portraits on Paper, Scottish Arts Council, 1984
 One of a Kind, Glasgow Print Studio, 1985
 Still-Life, Harris Museum, Preston, 1985
 Scottish Landscapes, National Gallery of Brazil, Rio de Janeiro, 1986
 The Flower Show, Stoke-on-Trent Art Gallery, touring show, 1986
 Flowers of Scotland, Fine Art Society, Glasgow
 Scottish Art Since 1900, Scottish National Gallery of Modern Art
 Images of Paradise, Rainforest Fund, 1988
 Within These Shores, a selection of works from the Chantrey Bequest, Graves Art Gallery, Sheffield, 1989
 Scottish Monotypes, Glasgow, Print Studio
 Salute to Turner, National Trust, London, 1990
 Brush to Paper, 3 Centuries of British Watercolours, Aberdeen Art Gallery touring exhibition, 1991
 Writing on the Wall, Tate Gallery, London, 1993
 The Line of Tradition, National Gallery of Scotland, 1993
 Celebration, Hunterian Art Gallery, University of Glasgow, 1999
 Liberation and Tradition, Scottish Art 1963-1975, Aberdeen Art Gallery, McManus Gallery, Dundee, 1999

References

External links
 
Glasgow Print Studio, Elizabeth Blackadder. Works for sale.
Dame Elizabeth Blackadder biography & artworks from the Permanent Collection of the Gracefield Arts Centre in Dumfries, Scotland virtual representation of Gracefield Arts Centre at exploreart.co.uk

Royal Academicians
1931 births
2021 deaths
Alumni of the Edinburgh College of Art
Dames Commander of the Order of the British Empire
Members of the Royal West of England Academy
People from Falkirk
Royal Scottish Academicians
Scottish printmakers
Scottish watercolourists
Scottish women painters
People educated at Falkirk High School
Women printmakers
Women watercolorists
British printmakers
21st-century British women artists